Middlebury is an unincorporated community in Harrison Township, Clay County, Indiana. It is part of the Terre Haute Metropolitan Statistical Area.

History
Middlebury was laid out in 1836.

The only post office the community of Middlebury contained was called Martz. It operated from 1854 until 1907.

Geography

References

External links

Unincorporated communities in Clay County, Indiana
Unincorporated communities in Indiana
Terre Haute metropolitan area
1836 establishments in Indiana
Populated places established in 1836